Timothy Shira is an Indian politician from Meghalaya. He is a member of the National People's Party.

In 2003, he was elected from North Garo Hills district's Resubelpara assembly constituency of Meghalaya. He is elected as the Protem Speaker for the assembly in March 2023.

References

Living people
Nationalist Congress Party politicians from Meghalaya
People from North Garo Hills district
Year of birth missing (living people)
Meghalaya MLAs 2018–2023
National People's Party (India) politicians
Garo people
Meghalaya MLAs 2003–2008
Meghalaya MLAs 2008–2013